Puerto Rico Highway 100 (PR-100) is a secondary highway in southwestern Puerto Rico, located mostly in the municipality of Cabo Rojo.

Route description
Beginning at its intersection with PR-2 in Hormigueros, Puerto Rico, the highway runs south for about 15 kilometers and is main gateway to local tourist destinations such as Boquerón, Combate (via PR-301 and PR-3301) and Puerto Real. It also connects PR-2 to PR-102. It is mostly divided, but in the end it is three lanes (2 to go and 1 returning, and later backwards). It ends at PR-301.

Major intersections

See also

 List of highways numbered 100

References

External links
 

100